Miller v. California, 413 U.S. 15 (1973), was a landmark decision of the U.S. Supreme Court modifying its definition of obscenity from that of "utterly without socially redeeming value" to that which lacks "serious literary, artistic, political, or scientific value". It is now referred to as the three-prong standard or the Miller test.

Background 
In 1971, Marvin Miller, an owner/operator of a California mail-order business specializing in pornographic films and books, sent out a brochure advertising books and a film that graphically depicted sexual activity between men and women. The brochure used in the mailing contained graphic images from the books and the film. Five of the brochures were mailed to a restaurant in Newport Beach, California. The owner and his mother opened the envelope and seeing the brochures, called the police.

Miller was arrested and charged with violating California Penal Code 311.2(a) which says in part, "Every person who knowingly sends or causes to be sent, or brings or causes to be brought, into this state for sale or distribution, or in this state possesses, prepares, publishes, produces, or prints, with intent to distribute or to exhibit to others, or who offers to distribute, distributes, or exhibits to others, any obscene matter is for a first offense, guilty of a misdemeanor." California lawmakers wrote the statute based on two previous Supreme Court obscenity cases, Memoirs v. Massachusetts and Roth v. United States.

Miller was tried by jury in the Superior Court of Orange County. At the conclusion of the evidence phase, the judge instructed the jury to evaluate the evidence by the community standards of California, i.e., as defined by the statute. The jury returned a guilty verdict.

Miller appealed to the Appellate Division of the Superior Court, arguing that the jury instructions did not use the standard set in Memoirs v. Massachusetts which said that in order to be judged obscene, materials must be "utterly without redeeming social value." Miller argued that only a national standard for obscenity could be applied. The appellate division rejected the argument and affirmed the jury verdict. Miller then filed an appeal with the California Court of Appeal for the Third District, which declined to review. Miller applied to the Supreme Court for certiorari, which was granted. Oral arguments were heard in January 1972.

Previous Supreme Court decisions on obscenity
The U.S. Supreme Court granted certiorari to Miller because the California law was based on its two previous obscenity cases which the Court wanted to revisit. Chief Justice Warren Burger came to the Court in 1969 believing that the Court's obscenity jurisprudence was misguided and governments should be given more leeway to ban obscene materials. In consideration of Miller in May and June 1972, Burger pushed successfully for a looser definition of "obscenity" which would allow local prosecutions, while Justice William J. Brennan, Jr., who by now also believed the Roth and Memoirs tests should be abandoned, led the charge for protecting all "obscenity" unless distributed to minors or exposed offensively to unconsenting adults. Decision of the case was contentious, and Miller was put over for reargument for October term in 1972, and did not come down until June 1973, with Burger prevailing with a 5–4 vote.

Since the Court's decision in Roth v. United States, the Court had struggled to define what constituted constitutionally unprotected obscene material. Under the Comstock laws that prevailed before Roth, articulated most famously in the 1868 English case Regina v Hicklin, any material that tended to "deprave and corrupt those whose minds are open to such immoral influences" was deemed "obscene" and could be banned on that basis. Thus, works by Honoré de Balzac, Gustave Flaubert, James Joyce, and D. H. Lawrence were banned based on isolated passages and the effect they might have on children. Roth repudiated the "Hicklin test" and defined obscenity more strictly, as material whose "dominant theme taken as a whole appeals to the prurient interest" to the "average person, applying contemporary community standards". Only material now meeting this test could be banned as "obscene".

In Memoirs v. Massachusetts, a plurality of the Court further redefined the Roth test by holding unprotected only that which is "patently offensive" and "utterly without redeeming social value," but no opinion in that case could command a majority of the Court either, and the state of the law in the obscenity field remained confused.  In Jacobellis v. Ohio, Justice Potter Stewart's concurring opinion said that the Court in earlier pornography cases "was faced with the task of trying to define what may be indefinable," and that criminal laws were constitutionally limited to "hard-core pornography," which he did not try to define: "perhaps I could never succeed in intelligibly doing so. But I know it when I see it." Other Justices  had equally been unwilling to clearly define what pornography could be prohibited by the First Amendment.

Supreme Court decision
Miller had based his appeal in California on Memoirs v. Massachusetts. The Court rejected that argument.
The question before the court was whether the sale and distribution of obscene material was protected under the First Amendment's guarantee of Freedom of Speech. The Court ruled that it was not. It indicated that "obscene material is not protected by the First Amendment," especially that of hardcore pornography, thereby reaffirming part of Roth.

However, the Court acknowledged "the inherent dangers of undertaking to regulate any form of expression," and said that "State statutes designed to regulate obscene materials must be carefully limited." The Court, in an attempt to set such limits, devised a set of three criteria which must be met for a work to be legitimately subject to state regulation:
 whether the average person, applying contemporary "community standards," would find that the work, taken as a whole, appeals to the prurient interest;
 whether the work depicts or describes, in an offensive way, sexual conduct or excretory functions, as specifically defined by applicable state law (the syllabus of the case mentions only sexual conduct, but excretory functions are explicitly mentioned on page 25 of the majority opinion); and
 whether the work, taken as a whole, lacks serious literary, artistic, political, or scientific value.

This obscenity test overturns the definition of obscenity set out in the Memoirs decision, which held that "all ideas having even the slightest redeeming social importance ... have the full protection of the guaranties [of the First Amendment]" and that obscenity was that which was "utterly without redeeming social importance".

The Miller decision vacated the jury verdict and remanded the case back to the California Superior Court.

Definition of obscenity post-Miller
Miller provided states greater freedom in prosecuting alleged purveyors of "obscene" material because, for the first time since Roth, a majority of the Court agreed on a definition of "obscenity." Hundreds of "obscenity" prosecutions went forward after Miller, and the Supreme Court began denying review of these state actions after years of reviewing many "obscenity" convictions (over 60 appeared on the Court's docket for the 1971–72 term, pre-Miller).

A companion case to Miller, Paris Adult Theatre I v. Slaton, provided states with greater leeway to shut down adult movie houses. Controversy arose over Millers "community standards" analysis, with critics charging that Miller encouraged forum shopping to prosecute national producers of what some believe to be "obscenity" in locales where community standards differ substantially from the rest of the nation. For example, under the "community standards" prong of the Miller test, what might be considered "obscene" in Massachusetts might not be considered "obscene" in Utah, or the opposite might be true; in any event, prosecutors tend to bring charges in locales where they believe that they will prevail. Justice Brennan, author of the Roth opinion, argued in his dissent for Paris Adult Theatre that outright suppression of obscenity is too vague to enforce in line with the First and Fourteenth Amendments.

The standards established by Miller were elaborated upon in Pope v. Illinois in 1987. In the case, the jury instructions for the local court had been for the jurors to evaluate whether adult magazines had value according to a community standard, and the conviction was held by the Illinois appellate court. The Supreme Court overruled the appellate court decision, siding with the defendant. In the majority opinion, the Supreme Court held that the first two prongs of the test were to be evaluated according to a "community standard," but not the third, which was to be held to the higher standard of a "reasonable person" evaluating the work for value.

In 1987, Oregon became the first state to strike down the criminalization of obscenity. In State v. Henry, the Oregon Supreme Court ruled in favor of Earl Henry, the owner of an adult bookstore, stating that the state obscenity statute violated the free speech provision of Oregon's state constitution.

In 1997, the Supreme Court ruled in Reno v. American Civil Liberties Union that the anti-indecency provisions of the Communications Decency Act were unconstitutional. The Act had criminalized the sending of "obscene or indecent" material to minors over the Internet. The court unanimously ruled that the provision violated the First Amendment due to its burden on free speech.

Effects of the decision
In the years since Miller, many localities have cracked down on adult theatres and bookstores, as well as nude dancing, through restrictive zoning ordinances and public nudity laws.

Additionally, in 1982's New York v. Ferber the Court declared child pornography as unprotected by the First Amendment, upholding the state of New York's ban on that material. In the 2002 Ashcroft v. Free Speech Coalition case, however, the Court held that sexually explicit material that only appears to depict minors, but actually does not, might be exempt from obscenity rulings.

In American Booksellers Foundation for Free Expression v. Strickland, plaintiffs American Booksellers Foundation for Free Expression, joined by various publishers, retailers, and web site operators, sued Ohio's Attorney General and Ohio county prosecutors in United States District Court for the Southern District of Ohio. Plaintiffs alleged that Ohio Revised Code §2907.01(E) and (J), which prohibited the dissemination or display of "materials harmful to juveniles", unconstitutionally violated both the First Amendment and the Commerce Clause of the Constitution. Plaintiffs specifically challenged the statute's definition of "harmful to juveniles", as well as the provisions governing Internet dissemination of those materials. The court held the statute unconstitutional because the statute's definition of "material harmful to minors" did not comply with Miller.

The "community standards" portion of the decision is of particular relevance with the rise of the Internet, as materials believed by some to be "obscene" can be accessed from anywhere in the nation, including places where there is a greater concern about "obscenity" than other areas of the nation. Enforcing and applying obscenity laws to the Internet have proven difficult. Both the Child Pornography Prevention Act (CPPA) and the Child Online Protection Act (COPA) have had sections struck down as unconstitutional in cases such as Ashcroft v. Free Speech Coalition and Ashcroft v. ACLU.

See also
 List of United States Supreme Court cases, volume 413
 Sex-related court cases
United States obscenity law

References

Further reading

External links

 First Amendment Library entry for Miller v. California
 Audio recordings or oral arguments and rearguments, from Oyez.org

United States Supreme Court decisions that overrule a prior Supreme Court decision
United States First Amendment case law
United States Supreme Court cases of the Burger Court
United States obscenity case law
1973 in United States case law
1973 in California
Legal history of California
United States Supreme Court cases